Frederic Stanford (1883 – 3 January 1964) was the fourth Bishop of Cariboo.

He was educated at King's College London and ordained in 1908. After  curacies at All Souls, Grosvenor Park, Camberwell and St Chad's, Regina he was Rector of St Peter's, Regina until 1928. He was Principal of Gordon's Indian School, Punnichy from 1928 to 1931 and after that Vicar of Windermere until 1942. In 1943 he was appointed to the episcopate and served for a decade.

References

1883 births
Alumni of King's College London
Anglican bishops of Cariboo
20th-century Anglican Church of Canada bishops
1964 deaths